The 1995 Rover British Clay Court Championships was a women's tennis tournament played on outdoor clay courts at  West Hants Tennis Club in Bournemouth in the United Kingdom that was part of Tier IV of the 1995 WTA Tour. It was the ninth edition of the tournament and was held from 15 to 20 May 1995. Unseeded Ludmila Richterová won the singles title.

Finals

Singles

 Ludmila Richterová defeated  Patricia Hy-Boulais 6–7, 6–4, 6–3
 It was Richterova's only title of the year and the 1st of her career.

Doubles

 Mariaan de Swardt /  Ruxandra Dragomir defeated  Kerry-Anne Guse /  Patricia Hy-Boulais 6–3, 7–5
 It was de Swardt's only title of the year and the 1st of her career. It was Dragomir's only title of the year and the 2nd of her career.

External links
 ITF tournament edition details

Rover British Clay Court Championships
British Hard Court Championships
Rover British Clay Court Championships
Rover British Clay Court Championships
Rover